The following list (organized by faction) covers every known character in the G.I. Joe: A Real American Hero toy line to have received his/her own action figure. It includes the year the characters' version 1 action figure debuted, their code names and real names, function, and original rank/grade (if applicable). It does not include every edition of the character, or the code name and rank changes that occurred, and only covers the action figures' releases in North America.

Relating the characters to their appearances in the various comic book series, (vol. 1) refers to the original comics series published by Marvel Comics, SM for the G.I. Joe: Special Missions spin-off (also published by Marvel), (vol. 2) for the comics series by Devil's Due Publishing and FL for the G.I. Joe: Frontline spin-off. Although the majority of characters had action figures issued prior to their first appearance in the comic books, a few exceptions (such as the Oktober Guardsmen) exist where their comic book introduction predates their action figures. With IDW's revival of G.I. Joe: A Real American Hero, which picks up immediately following the final issue of the original Marvel Comics run at issue no. 155½, and the statement by Hasbro that "we are currently taking the brand in a direction that does not take the Devil’s Due story into account," the volume 2 stories (including characters killed in action (KIA)) have been rendered non-canon.

In 2007, Hasbro marked the 25th anniversary of the G.I. Joe: A Real American Hero toyline by introducing a collection of newly sculpted 100 mm figures (as opposed to the 3¾" scale of the RAH line). These figures replaced the classic O-ring construction with a swivel chest feature, and increased the number of points of articulation beyond the standard shoulder, elbow and knees, to swivel wrists, ankles, and double-hinged knees. Since then, new figures have continued to feature the updated articulation. Since 2011, all convention and collector's club exclusives have also used the updated figure style.

G.I. Joe Team

A Real American Hero (1982–1994)

Stars & Stripes Forever – TRU exclusives (1997–1998)

A Real American Hero Collection (2000–2002)

G.I. Joe vs Cobra (2002–2005)

Direct to Consumer (DTC) (2005–2006)

25th Anniversary (2007–2009)

Rise of Cobra (2009)

Pursuit of Cobra (2010–2011)

30th Anniversary (2011–2012)

50th Anniversary (2014–2016)

Convention exclusives

G.I. Joe Collector's Club exclusives

Cobra Command

25th Anniversary-style Cobra figures

Dreadnoks

Iron Grenadiers

Oktober Guard

See also
 Action Force
 G.I. Joe: America's movable fighting man
 List of G.I. Joe: A Real American Hero playsets
 List of G.I. Joe: A Real American Hero vehicles

References

External links
 YOJOE.com Action Figure Archive

1980s toys
1990s toys
2000s toys
Action figures
Hasbro products
Lists of G.I. Joe characters
G.I. Joe: A Real American Hero